Robert Denoon Cumming (October 27, 1916 – 25 August 2004) was a Canadian-American philosopher and historian of twentieth-century Continental philosophy, especially phenomenology. He taught at Columbia University from 1948 to 1985, when he retired as Frederick E. Woodbridge professor emeritus of philosophy.

Life
Born in Cape Breton Island, Nova Scotia, Cumming grew up in Bangor, Maine. He graduated from Harvard University in 1938 with an A.B. in classics, summa cum laude, and was elected to Phi Beta Kappa. He then studied at New College, Oxford as a Rhodes Scholar. During World War II he served in U.S. military intelligence, liaising with the Free French Forces and earning the French Croix de Guerre, the Legion of Merit, and the Purple Heart.

After the war he studied at the Sorbonne, gaining his PhD in philosophy from the University of Chicago in 1950 under the supervision of Richard McKeon. Appointed instructor at Columbia University in 1948, he stayed at the university until his retirement in 1985. He was chairman of the Columbia philosophy department from 1961 to 1964.

Works
 (revised tr., with intro.) Euthyphro, Apology, and Crito, and the death scene from Phaedo by Plato. 1948.
 (ed. with intro.) The philosophy of Jean-Paul Sartre by Jean-Paul Sartre. 1965
 Human Nature and History; a study of the development of liberal political thought, 1969.
 Starting Point: an introduction to the dialectic of existence, 1979.
 Phenomenology and Deconstruction: The dream is over, 1991.
 Method and Imagination, 1992
 Solitude, 2001
 Breakdown in Communication, 2002

Notes

References
 David Kettler, 'Robert Denoon Cumming (1916-2004), Political Theory Vol. 33, No. 2 (Apr., 2005), pp. 154–157

External links
 

1916 births
2004 deaths
20th-century American philosophers
Phenomenologists
American historians of philosophy
20th-century American historians
20th-century American male writers
Harvard College alumni
Columbia University faculty
People from Cape Breton Island
University of Chicago alumni
American Rhodes Scholars
Alumni of New College, Oxford
Recipients of the Croix de Guerre 1939–1945 (France)
United States Army officers
Recipients of the Legion of Merit
United States Army personnel of World War II
American male non-fiction writers
21st-century American philosophers